The Great Northern Z-1 was a class of ten electric locomotives built for the Great Northern Railway They were used to work the route through the second Cascade Tunnel. They were built between 1926–1928 by Baldwin Locomotive Works, with Westinghouse electrics, and stayed in service until dieselisation in 1956.

Electrification 

The route West from Wenatchee and on to Seattle needed to cross the Northern Cascades by the Stevens Pass. The initial route, from 1893, had been steeply graded and required a number of switchbacks. As this was also a mountainous area with severe winters, the Cascade Tunnel was built to avoid these and opened in 1900.

The Great Northern Railway was steam-hauled from the outset, later by diesel, and did not generally adopt electric power. Electrification was only used for a short distance, through the tunnel itself. The electrification scheme here was unusual, although not unique at the time, using 3 phase AC with two overhead wires and trolley pole current collectors.

An avalanche in 1910 caused 96 fatalities to passengers and crew of a train trapped by snowdrifts at the depot of Wellington, by the West portal of the tunnel. This tunnel opened on 12 January 1929 and continues in use today. The Wellingington depot was first renamed to Tye, then abandoned and relocated to a new location at Skykomish. In 1926 it was decided that rather than just working through the tunnel by electric haulage, it would now be used over the whole 73 mile stretch from Skykomish to Cascade.

Design 
The boxcabs working the first tunnel had used a three-phase electrification system. The new extended electrification was to replace this with a single phase system from Westinghouse,  at the same 25 Hz frequency but with the voltage raised from 6.6 kV to 11 kV. This had previously been demonstrated by Westinghouse with the New Haven EP-1 and on the Detroit, Toledo and Ironton Railroad. As there was now only a single overhead wire, current could be collected by diamond pantographs, rather than trolley poles. The insulators and clearances were designed so that the electrification voltage could potentially be doubled to 22 kV in the future.

Baldwin and Westinghouse built a series of locomotives based on similar electric supplies, including a number for the New Haven Railroad.

Layout 
The locomotives were built as pairs of semi-permanently coupled units, and were always used as such. They were boxcab locomotives, with a simple rectangular body over a rigid frame. The four driven axles were carried in this frame, mounted in separate axlebox hornguides for suspension, but with separate traction motors and no mechanical coupling between them, giving a 1′Do1′ arrangement. A control cab was provided at each end, although only one was equipped. The intention had been that if the locomotives were used as separate units in the future, the second cab could then be equipped to allow for running in the other direction.

Electrical equipment 
Each locomotive was equipped with two pantographs, although only one was used at a time and the other was intended as a spare. As they were used as coupled pairs, the high voltage pantograph busbar of the two units was linked between them to give a longer connection length to the catenary wire.

A high voltage transformer in each unit stepped the line voltage down, then supplied a motor-generator set which acted as a rectifier. This use of motor-generators would be seen as a characteristic feature of all Great Northern Railway electrics. The main generator was rated at 600 V DC and 1,500 kW. Additional generators were also provided: a 125 V 75 kW  generator supplied field excitation for the main generator and some auxiliary supplies. A third generator was used to provide traction motor field during regenerative braking, and was only energised when braking. A further winding on the motor acted as an AC generator, used to supply the two traction motor ventilating blowers and a third blower for the main transformer. This provided three phase AC at first, for starting, and then switched to single phase. A lead-acid battery could power the control and lighting equipment with main power interrupted and was also needed for starting the motor-generator, as this was not self-starting from the AC supply alone.

Regenerative braking had been used from the outset on the 3-phase boxcabs, although this had been dissipated by a load bank at the power station; with the single phase electrification, it could now be re-used by another train or fed into the supply network.

Control equipment 
Westinghouse HBFR electro-pneumatic multiple-unit control equipment was fitted. This was normally used to operate the locomotives as permanently-coupled pairs, but these pairs could also be coupled together and operated from a single cab.

Traction motors 
Four nose-hung DC traction motors were used, one per axle. Drive was by a motor pinion to a flexible gear on the axle shaft. The motors were always connected in parallel. Many similar four-axle Do locomotives used a switching of the motors from parallel to series or series-parallel circuits for their main control between starting and running. For the Great Northern though, the flexibility of the motor-generator system and its control over the excitation field winding offered better control. The motor field could be operated as either series-wound, or with separate excitation from the generator with either a constant-current or constant-horsepower characteristics.

Service 

The first pair of Z-1 arrived in December 1926, followed by a second pair a month later, both before the opening of the new tunnel. These first replaced the three phase boxcabs by rewiring the old tunnel as single phase. The electrification voltage was switched on 5 March  1927. After this time the boxcabs were withdrawn and the Z-1s took over. These first two pairs of locomotives operated almost the entire service for 1927, with a mileage of around 50,000 each per annum. Transit times were reduced from 4 hours with a 2,500 ton eastbound train to 1 hour 45 minutes and a 3,500 ton train. The ends of the electrified section are at a similar elevation of around 750 feet, with the peak of the line at the Eastern portal of the tunnel at 2,800 feet. The Eastbound climb is 20 miles of a constant 2.2% grade, then a similar distance through the tunnel at 1.56%. The Westbound climb is longer and more varied in gradient, with 50 miles between Wenatchee and the tunnel portal, at a maximum of 2.2%. The rated speed of the locomotives was such that they could use their full power when climbing any gradient more than 0.7%

The first of eight Y-1 locomotives arrived late in 1927, and these served alongside the Z-1s. The Y-1 was a more powerful and heavier ( 1-C+C-1 (or (1′Co)+(Co1′) as UIC) locomotive, and they were used individually rather than in pairs.

The new Cascade Tunnel was opened on 12 January 12, 1929. All five pairs of Z-1 had been delivered by this time, as had four of the Y-1.

The Great Northern initially used a 'Pullman Green' livery for its electric locomotives. When the W-1 cab unit units arrived in 1947, they were painted in a new 'Empire Builder' scheme of orange and green separated by gold lining. The other electrics were later repainted in these Empire Builder colors, but not the oldest of the stock, the Z-1s.

Post-WWII the decision was taken, in common with many of the other US electric railways operating with 1920s equipment, to convert to diesel haulage rather than to renew the electrification system. This would allow straight-through haulage by the same locomotives, rather than interchanging between steam and electric. Improved ventilation was needed for the tunnel though, and a forced ventilation fan house was built around the East portal, powered by the same traction current. This involved providing a closed door to the tunnel portal to control airflow, which opened automatically as a train approached.

All Z-1s were retired and scrapped on August 1956. The other GN electric locomotives were sold on to other railroads.

References 

 

Z-1
Electric locomotives of the United States
Baldwin locomotives
Westinghouse locomotives
Standard gauge locomotives of the United States
Railway locomotives introduced in 1909
Scrapped locomotives
1-D-1 locomotives
1′Do1′ locomotives
11 kV AC locomotives